In horoscopic astrology, a Saturn return is an astrological transit that occurs when the planet Saturn returns to the same ecliptic longitude that it occupied at the moment of a person's birth. While the planet may not first reach the exact location until the person is 29 or 30 years old, the influence of the Saturn return is considered to start in the person's late twenties, notably the age of 27.

Psychologically, the first Saturn return is seen as the time of reaching full adulthood, and being faced, perhaps for the first time, with adult challenges and responsibilities.

In Western astrology

The phenomenon is described by Western astrologers as influencing a person's life development at roughly  29.5 year intervals, though the planetary influence may be felt for a few years before the exact conjunction, and variable orbits of the planets can also make the time period longer or shorter. These intervals or "returns" coincide with the approximate time it takes the planet Saturn to make one orbit around the sun, roughly 29.5 years. Western astrologers believe that, as Saturn "returns" to the degree in its orbit occupied at the time of birth, a person crosses over a major threshold and enters the next stage of life.  With the first Saturn return, a person leaves youth behind and enters adulthood. With the second return, maturity. And with the third and usually final return, a person enters wise old age. These periods are estimated to occur at roughly the ages of 27–31, 56–60 and 84–90. A fourth return—for those who live to see the age of 114–118—is sufficiently rare that it is not given coverage in the astrological literature.

See also
 27 Club
 Midlife crisis
 Quarter life crisis
 Saturn return (disambiguation)

Notes

References 
 
 

Technical factors of astrology
Horoscopic astrology